Xinyuan may refer to:

China

Xinyuan County (新源县), Ili Kazakh Autonomous Prefecture, Xinjiang
Xinyuan Real Estate (鑫苑置业), real estate company
Xinyuan, Siyang County (新袁镇), town in Siyang County, Jiangsu

Taiwan
Xinyuan, Pingtung (新園鄉), or Sinyuan, a rural township in Pingtung County

Personal name
Xinyuan (also transcripted Xin-Yuan and Xin Yuan) is a Chinese personal name, often male and sometimes female. People include, in Chinese surname-first order:
Li Xinyuan
Liu Xinyuan
Mao Xinyuan
Yu Xinyuan